For the current city, see Saginaw, Michigan

The City of Saginaw (Saginaw City) is a defunct city in Saginaw County in the U.S. state of Michigan that has been consolidated into a new municipality bearing the same name. To distinguish between the currently existing City of Saginaw and the former City of Saginaw, the name Saginaw City is used  for the defunct city even though it was never incorporated under that name or called such during its time.

The first permanent white settlement in the area was a fur-trading post on the west side of the Saginaw River established in 1816 by Louis Campau. The U.S. federal government extinguished Native American interests for most of the land in the area with the Treaty of Saginaw in 1819, clearing the way for white settlers. In 1822 the post became Fort Saginaw. Campau platted the town in 1823.

Saginaw City was incorporated as a city in 1857.  On June 2, 1889, the Michigan State Legislature passed an act to consolidate the cities of Saginaw City and East Saginaw to form the present-day city of Saginaw, which became effective with the election of officers for the consolidated city in March 1890.

See also
City of Saginaw
City of East Saginaw
History of Saginaw, Michigan
Saginaw County

References

Former cities in Michigan
Geography of Saginaw County, Michigan